John Willet, M.Inst.C.E. (6 February 1815 – 15 August 1891) was a Scottish engineer who was mainly involved in bridge design. His office was in Union Terrace, Aberdeen, as of 1882.

At the age of 22, he became an apprentice to James Thomson.

Personal life
Willet married Mary Ann Rennie (1832–1915) in 1854. They had at least two children: Archibald William Willet (1858–1942) and Mary Annabelle Willet (1859–1928).

He died in 1891, aged 76. He was interred in Allenvale Cemetery, Aberdeen. His wife and daughter are also buried there.

References 
Specific

General
 The Architect, Volumes 13-14 (Gilbert Wood, 1875)
 The Builder (1907)
 Oliver & Boyd's new Edinburgh almanac and national repository (1884)

External links
 John Willet - ScottishArchitects.org.uk
 John Willet at FindAGrave.com

1815 births
1891 deaths
Scottish engineers
People from South Ayrshire
Alumni of Heriot-Watt University